Daniel Shulman may refer to:

 Daniel Shulman, American musician
 Dan Shulman, Canadian sportscaster

See also
 Daniel Schulman (disambiguation)